Paranjothi, popularly known as Sirruthondar was an army general of the great Pallava king Narasimavarman I who ruled South India from 630–668 CE. He also led the Pallava army during the invasion of Vatapi in 642 CE. In the later years of his life, Paranjothi gave up violence and became a wandering Saivite monk, Sirruthonda nayanar. He is venerated as one of the 63 Nayanmars.

Early life 
Paranjothi, was born in Chengattankudi (now Thiruchenkkatukudi) village of Nagapattinam district, Tamil Nadu during the 7th century AD. Tamil Nadu was ruled by Mahendravarman I of the Pallava dynasty with Kanchipuram as its capital. Paranjothi, who had mastered the art of war moves to Kanchipuram to learn literature and saivite scriptures, Kanchipuram was then a renowned knowledge capital in India.

Conquest of Vatapi 
King Mahendravarman I, impressed by the courage and valour of Paranjothi appointed him as a commander in his army. After the death of Mahendravarman in 630 CE, his son Narasimavarman became the ruler of the Pallava dynasty and Paranjothi became his army general. Paranjothi was also a close friend of king Narasimavarman. Paranjothi as a trusted general of Narasimavarman, lead his forces to Vatapi in 642 CE for war against the Chalukya king, Pulakeshin. Pulakeshin was killed in the battle and Vatapi was burnt to ground to avenge the defeat of Mahendravarman by Pulakeshin in the battle of Pullalur in 618 CE.

Vatapi Ganapathi 
During the dawn of war, Paranjothi worshipped a Ganesha sculpture on the walls of Vatapi fort. On the return from the victorious battlefield, he took the statue of Ganesha to his birthplace Tiruchenkattankudi to be worshipped as Vatapi Ganapathi. The statue and shrine to Vathapi Ganapathi is located in a temple in Tiruchenkattankudi in Nagapattinam  district in the Tamil Nadu state of India.

Sirutthondar 
On the victorious battle field Paranjothi underwent a change of heart and devoted himself to Lord Shiva. Paranjothi became an ardent devotee of Lord Siva and was then called as Thiirutthondar. He later became one of 63 Nayanmar Saints. Thirutthondar's life and devotion are narrated in Sekkizhar's Periya Puranam.

In Popular Culture
Paranjothi is one of the prominent characters in Tamil historical fiction novel Sivagamiyin Sapatham by Kalki Krishnamurthy. This talks about the young years of Pranjothi where he raises in the ranks of the Pallava army and becomes the army general, his deeds in securing the Kachi fort from the imminent Vatapi invasion, his war on Vatapi Pulikesi and his eventual win over the Chalukyas.

Further reading
 Parthiban Kanavu
 Sivagamiyin sabatham
 Vatapi Ganapathi

References

External links
 

Nayanars
7th-century monarchs in Asia
Year of birth missing
Year of death missing